The 2006 American Handball Men's Youth Championships took place in Blumenau from August 29 – September 2. It acts as the Pan American qualifying tournament for the 2007 Men's Youth World Handball Championship.

Teams

Preliminary round

Group A

Group B

Placement 5th–7th

Final round

Semifinals

Bronze medal match

Gold medal match

Final standing

References 
 brasilhandebol.com.br

2006 in handball
Pan American Men's Youth Handball Championship
2006 in Brazilian sport
September 2006 sports events in South America
August 2006 sports events in South America